Aşağı Kəsəmən (also, İskra, Yenikänd, Yenikend, and Yerikend) is a village and municipality in the Agstafa Rayon of Azerbaijan.  It has a population of 2,596.

References 

Populated places in Aghstafa District